USA Cares is an American non-profit organization (EIN: 46-2092762) in Radcliff, Kentucky. It was founded in 2003 to give financial and other help to former members of the armed forces of the United States. George W. Bush spoke of its work during a speech at Fort Bragg on July 4, 2006.

References

External links
U.S.DOD News on USA Cares
Business Wire Article

Charities based in Kentucky
Veterans' affairs in the United States
United States military support organizations
Organizations established in 2003
2003 establishments in Kentucky